Orthotylus  rubidus is a species of bug from the Miridae family that can be found in European countries such as Austria, Bulgaria, France, Germany, Great Britain, Greece, Moldova, Romania, Slovenia, the Netherlands, Ukraine, and northwest Russia. It is small, red and feeds on Salicornia in saline environments.

References

Insects described in 1874
Hemiptera of Europe
rubidus